HMS Redbridge was the mercantile schooner Union that the Royal Navy purchased in 1804. She wrecked at Nassau, Bahamas in November 1806.

Career
She was registered on 10 September 1805. Lieutenant Edward Burt commissioned her. 

On 11 July 1806 Redbridge was in company with the privateer Fanny when they captured the American brig Stork. At some point Burt was shot through the hand while chasing a privateer into a port in Cuba.

Redbridge was wrecked at Nassau on 4 November 1806. Redbridge anchored and Lieutenant Burt went ashore to speak with the Governor. While he was ashore the pilot and master tried to move Redbridge to a better anchorage. Redbridge hit a rock, bilged, and rolled on her side. Her masts were cut away but all that could be done was to remove her crew. Next morning Redbridge was abandoned as a wreck. The subsequent court-martial exonerated Burt.

Citations and references
Citations

References
 
 
  

1800s ships
schooners of the Royal Navy
Maritime incidents in 1806
Shipwrecks of the Bahamas